The Rice Fork is a  tributary of the Eel River in Lake County, California. Before the construction of Scott Dam in the 1920s, which formed Lake Pillsbury, the Rice Fork ran directly into the Eel River. It is one of Lake County's longest streams.

The many tributaries to Rice Fork are Salt Creek, French Creek, Parramore Creek, Bevans Creek, Bear Creek, Packsaddle Creek, Willow Creek, Deer Creek, Rice Creek, and Soda Creek.

History

In the 1860s, there was a very dry year in the Sacramento Valley. A man by the name of Rice and some neighbors brought horses and mules up to Rice Valley, and used it and adjoining territory for the fine pasture. Rice Valley was their headquarters. Rice was active in that area for only a few years, but Rice Valley, Rice Creek, and the Rice Fork took his name.

At one time, an Indian trail went from the hot springs down the Rice Fork canyon to the mouth of the river where it entered Gravelly Valley, then crossed the river at the upper end of the valley, then went up Squaw Valley Creek to the north of Big Squaw Valley and over the ridge to the Indian village at Bloody Rock. A portion of this trail is now under Lake Pillsbury.

Watershed

Snow Mountain-West at  dominates the landscape on the east side of the Rice Fork watershed. Its massive west ridge drops down to Lake Pillsbury and divides the Rice Fork from the Eel River watershed, and its southern ridge connects with  Goat Mountain about  southeasterly to separate Rice Fork from the South Fork Stony Creek (Sacramento River) waters.

To the west of Snow Mountain-West, the ridges of  Pine Mountain,  Horse Mountain, and  Elk Mountain connect to form the western boundary of Rice Fork's watershed, while French Ridge joins with  Little Horse Mountain and the west ridge of Goat Mountain to define the southern limit, with all the waters flowing into Lake Pillsbury, the Eel River and on to the Pacific Ocean.

The Rice Fork drains 33 percent of the total drainage area of Lake Pillsbury, and may contribute a like percentage of the amount of inflow. The Rice Fork arm contains 7 percent of the surface area and 6 percent of the total volume of the reservoir. Most of the sediment in Lake Pillsbury is deposited in the upper reaches of the Eel River and Rice Fork arms.

Hale Ridge Research Natural Area (RNA)

Rice Fork defines the southern boundary of the  Hale Ridge Research Natural Area (RNA), and parallels the east side of Forest Road 17N04 (Twin Valley Road), as it flows along the western boundary of the RNA for about one mile. A designated critical habitat for the federally protected northern spotted owl, and a winter range for black-tailed deer, the RNA was established by the U.S. Forest Service in 1987 to represent the knobcone pine forest for the North Coast Ranges. Within the RNA, dense stands of knobcone pine and mixed conifer forest, dominated by Douglas-fir, also provides a dispersal habitat for a Forest Service-listed sensitive species, the northern goshawk.

The underlying rocks of the RNA are all greywacke sandstones and shales. The greywacke has a muddy, brownish-gray sandstone appearance, ranging from rather soft and crumbly in weathered outcrops to solid rocks and boulders in the stream bed of the Rice Fork.

Some recreationists use Crabtree Hot Springs which is adjacent to the northwestern boundary of the RNA. The Rice Fork is also lightly used for recreation, but entry into the RNA is minimal. There is an unknown increase in risk of wildfire due to human use at the hot springs.

Tributaries

Salt Creek is one of the larger tributaries, and flows from Fir Root Spring.

River crossings, campgrounds and trailheads

River and creek crossings
Forest Road 17N04 (Twin Valley Road) crosses both Rice Fork and Salt Creek at their confluence.
Forest Road M-10 (county road 301-C) crosses Rice Fork a short distance downstream from its confluence with Bear Creek.
Forest Road M-10 (county road 301-C) bridges Bear Creek at its confluence with Blue Slides Creek.
Forest Road M-3 (18N04) crosses Rice Creek about 2 miles north of its junction with Forest Road M-10 (county road 301-C).
Forest Road M-3 (18N04) crosses Deer Creek about 5 miles north of its junction with Forest Road M-10 (county road 301-C).
Forest Road 17N16 (Long Ridge Road) crosses Bear Creek at its junction with Forest Road M-10 (county road 301-C).

Campgrounds and trailheads

Bear Creek Campground (USFS) – Free & open all year, maximum stay 14 days, 16 picnic tables & grilles + 2 toilets, elevation . This is the only public campground in the Rice Fork Eel River watershed.
A hiking trail follows the ridge line to the top of  Snow Mountain West Peak and  East Peak. A secondary forest road continues up the ridge to the trailhead.

See also
Rivers of Lake County, California

References

Mauldin's Notes on Lake County History
Lakeport Historic Courthouse Museum
Signature Page for Research Natural Area Establishment Record, Hale Ridge Research Natural Area, Mendocino National Forest, Lake County, California - 1987
USFS Mendocino National Forest
Current Stream Habitat Distribution Table - NOAA 1993
USGS POTATO HILL Quadrangle, California, 7.5-minute series topographic - 1996
USGS FOUTS SPRINGS Quadranglle, California, 7.5 minute series topographic - 1996
DFG Department of Fish and Game. 1993a. Rice Fork Eel River Stream Survey, August 16–19, Report by Kyle Murphy, Twyla Anderson, and Carl D. Reese
DFG Department of Fish and Game. 1993b. Packsaddle Creek Stream Survey, August 19, Report by Albert Rodriguez and Andrew Boydstun
DFG Department of Fish and Game. 1993c. Willow Creek Stream Survey, August 19, Report by Will Abel and Kerry Padgett
DFG Department of Fish and Game. 1993d. Deer Creek Stream Survey, August. Report by Carl D. Reese, Albert Rodriguez, and Jim Murphy
DFG Department of Fish and Game. 1993e. Rice Creek Stream Survey, August 16, Report by Kerry Padgett and Weldon E. Jones
DFG Department of Fish and Game. 1993g. Bevans Creek Stream Survey, September 24, Report by Alice Berg, Carl D. Reese, and Kerry Padgett
DFG Department of Fish and Game. 1993h. Bear Creek Stream Survey, August 16, 18, 31, Report by Carl D. Reese, Carl Murphy, and Kerry Padgett
DFG Department of Fish and Game. 1993j. Parramore Creek Stream Survey, August 18, Report by Alvert Rodriguez and Andrew Boydstun
DFG Department of Fish and Game. 1993k. French Creek Stream Survey, August 11, Report Carl D. Reese and Carl Murphy
DFG Department of Fish and Game. 1993m. Salt Creek Stream Survey, August 17, Report by Albert Rodriguez and Andrew Boydstun
USFS United States Forest Service. 2006b. French Creek Observations 2006, Lee Morgan Forest Fish Bio.
Geological Survey Water-Supply Paper 1619-EE, Sedimentation of Lake Pillsbury, Lake County, California, United States Department of the Interior, Stewart L. Udall, Secretary, U.S. Government Printing Office, Washington 1964

External links
Goat Mountain Restoration Program
Rice Fork Eel River above Lake Pillsbury
Photographic Journey - Friends of the Eel River

Rivers of Lake County, California
Hot springs of California
Rivers of Northern California
Tributaries of the Eel River (California)